Szymon Kazmierowski (born July 22, 1987 in Poznań) is a Polish football player currently playing for Orzeł Międzyrzecz.

Honours
Dyskobolia Grodzisk Wlkp

 Polish Cup:
Winner (1): 2006/2007
 Ekstraklasa Cup:
Winner (2): 2006/2007, 2007/2008

References
 
 Dyskobolia Grodzisk Wielkopolski website

1987 births
Living people
Polonia Warsaw players
Dyskobolia Grodzisk Wielkopolski players
Warta Poznań players
Chojniczanka Chojnice players
OKS Stomil Olsztyn players
Polish footballers
Footballers from Poznań
Association football forwards
Stal Rzeszów players